The Chicago Charities College All-Star Game was a preseason American football game played from 1934 to 1976 between the National Football League (NFL) champions and a team of star college seniors from the previous year. It was also known as the College All-Star Football Classic.

The game was contested annually — except for 1974, due to that year's NFL strike — and was played in July, August, or September. In the 42 College All-Star Games, the defending pro champions won 31, the All-Stars won nine, and two were ties, giving the collegians a .238 winning percentage.

The second game, played in 1935, involved the hometown Chicago Bears, runner-up of the 1934 season, instead of the defending champion New York Giants. The New York Jets played in the 1969 edition, although still an American Football League (AFL) team, as once the AFL-NFL Championship was introduced (including for the two seasons before the "Super Bowl" designation was officially adopted and the remaining two seasons before the AFL–NFL merger) the Super Bowl winner was the professional team involved, regardless of which league the team represented.

History of the game
The game was the idea of Arch Ward, the sports editor of the Chicago Tribune and the driving force behind baseball's All-Star Game. The game originally was a benefit for Chicago-area charities and was played at Soldier Field  except for two years during World War II, in 1943 and 1944, when it was held at Northwestern University's Dyche Stadium in Evanston.

The Chicago game was one of several "pro vs. rookie" college all-star games held across the United States in its early years (the 1939 season featured seven such games, all of which the NFL teams won in shutouts, and the season prior featured eight, with some of the collegiate players playing in multiple games).

Chicago's game had the benefit of being the highest profile, with the NFL champions facing the best college graduates from across the country as opposed to the regional games that were held elsewhere; because of this, the game survived far longer than its contemporaries.

The inaugural game in 1934, played before a crowd of 79,432 on August 31, was a scoreless tie between the All-Stars and the Chicago Bears. The following year, in a game that included University of Michigan graduate and future president Gerald Ford, the Bears won 5–0.

The first All-Star team to win was the 1937 squad, coached by Gus Dorais, which won 6–0 over Curly Lambeau's Green Bay Packers. The only score came on a 47-yard touchdown pass from future Hall of Famer Sammy Baugh to Gaynell Tinsley. Baugh's Washington Redskins lost to the All-Stars the next year, but he did not play due to injury.

In the 1940s, the games were competitive affairs that attracted large crowds to Soldier Field. The college All-Stars had the benefit of being fully integrated, since the NFL's league-wide color barrier did not apply to the squad, meaning black players such as Kenny Washington (who played in the 1940 contest) were allowed to play in the game. As the talent level of pro football improved (and the NFL itself integrated), the pros came to dominate the series.

The qualifying criteria for the College All-Star squad was loose, as the 1945 game featured Tom Harmon, who had begun his professional career in 1941 but had been interrupted by military service.

The All-Stars last won consecutive games in 1946 and 1947, and won only four of the final 29 games: the Philadelphia Eagles fell in 1950, the Cleveland Browns in 1955, and the Detroit Lions in 1958.

The last All-Star win came in 1963, when a college team coached by legendary quarterback Otto Graham beat Vince Lombardi's Green Bay Packers, 20–17.

In 1949, Ward, who by this time had founded the competing All-America Football Conference, attempted to have that league's champion, the perennially winning Browns, play that year's game instead of the NFL champion, but after the NFL threatened legal action, the Tribune board overruled Ward and renewed its agreement with the NFL.

By the late 1960s and the 1970s, enthusiasm for the game started to erode as NFL coaches  became increasingly reluctant to let their new draftees play in the exhibition game due to their being forced to miss part of training camp, and their draftees being at considerable risk for injury. As early as 1949, these concerns had been raised after Dick Rifenburg suffered a serious knee injury practicing for the game, effectively ending his professional career before it began, and prompting Rifenburg's move into broadcasting.

In 1974, a player's strike and an exodus of stars to the World Football League exacerbated this issue, as the NFL went to all-rookie rosters to allow the preseason to be played: with no rookies available to play for the College All-Stars, the game was cancelled that year.

During most of its run, the College All-Star Game was not particularly unique, since NFL teams frequently played exhibition games against non-NFL competition in its early decades. However, by the 1970s, the NFL was withdrawing from competition against teams that were not members of the league. Following the end of preseason games against teams from the Eastern Conference of the Canadian Football League in 1961, the NFL played only three games against non-NFL teams (excluding pre-merger exhibition games against AFL teams and College All-Star Games). The first two of these games, a 1969 split-squad match against a Continental Football League team and a 1972 split-squad match against a Seaboard Football League team, were large blowout wins for the NFL teams, while the third, between the Houston Oilers rookie and practice squad and the San Antonio Toros, was a much closer contest.

The final College All-Star Game took place in  during a torrential downpour at Soldier Field on July 23. Despite featuring star players such as Chuck Muncie, Mike Pruitt, Lee Roy Selmon, and Jackie Slater, the All-Stars were hopelessly outmatched by the Pittsburgh Steelers, winners of consecutive Super Bowls (IX, X).

The star quarterback for the College All-Stars, Steeler draft pick Mike Kruczek of Boston College,   left ten minutes into the first quarter after pulling his left thigh, with backup quarterback Craig Penrose of San Diego State suffering two broken fingers in the second quarter. Jeb Blount of Tulsa played most of the game.

With 1:22 remaining in the third quarter and the Steelers leading 24–0, high winds and lightning prompted All-Stars coach Ara Parseghian to call for a time out.

After the officials ordered both teams to their locker rooms, fans invaded the field and began sliding on the turf as the rain continued to fall heavily. Despite the efforts of officials, stadium security and Chicago Police, all attempts to clear the field failed, with a group of drunk fans tearing down the goalposts at the southern end of the stadium. However, by this time, the torrential rain had left parts of the field under  of water, meaning it would have been unplayable in any event.

At 11:01pm CDT, NFL Commissioner Pete Rozelle and the Tribune announced that the game had been called: the announcement was greeted with jeers, and numerous brawls broke out on the flooded field before order was finally restored.

Joe Washington of Oklahoma was selected as the MVP of the final College All-Star game.

Chicago Tribune Charities had every intention of staging a 1977 game, however, a combination of factors, including NFL coaches being increasingly reluctant to let their high draft picks play, rising insurance costs, and higher player salaries meant the game was no longer viable or competitive. As such, the Tribune announced on December 21, 1976, that the game would be discontinued. The game raised over $4 million for charity during the course of its 42-game run.

In the 42 College All-Star Games, the defending pro champions won 31, the All-Stars won nine, and two were ties, giving the collegians a  winning percentage. The 1976 College All-Star Game remains, as of 2021, the last time any NFL team has played a team from outside the league.

One aspect of the College All-Star Game was later revived: the concept of the league champion playing in the first game of the season was adopted in 2004 with the National Football League Kickoff game. Since then, the first game of the regular season is hosted by the defending Super Bowl champion.

Game results
All games played at Soldier Field in Chicago, except for the 1943 and 1944 games, which were played at Dyche Stadium in Evanston, Illinois.

1 Game was called with 1:22 left in the 3rd quarter due to lightning, torrential rain, and a field invasion by fans.

Franchise records
Listed by number of appearances

 Miami's second consecutive appearance in 1974 was cancelled due to NFL players' strike.

MVPs
The Most Valuable Player award was given from 1938 through 1973 and was always awarded to a player on the College All-Stars

See also
Pro Bowl, the AFC–NFC all-star game
Playoff Bowl, another discontinued annual NFL game
Pro Football Hall of Fame Game
College football all-star games

References

External links

 

National Football League competitions
College football all-star games